List of Serbian Academy of Sciences and Arts members:

Department of Mathematics, Physics and Geo Sciences
Bogoljub Stanković
Stevan Karamata
Zoran Maksimović - Secretary of the Department of Mathematics, Physics and Geo Sciences
Stevan Koički - Vice-President
Zvonko Marić - Representative of the Department
Milosav Marjanović
Mileva Prvanović
Olga Hadžić
Dragoš Cvetković
Fedor Mesinger
Vojislav Marić
Aleksandar Ivić
Božidar Vujanović
Fedor Herbut
Nikola Konjević
Marko Ercegovac
Stevo Todorčević

Corresponding members
Nikola Konjević
Marko Ercegovac
Zaviša Janjić
Stevan Pilipović
Đorde Šijački
Vidojko Jović
Milan Damnjanović
Gradimir Milovanović

Nonresident members
Nemanja Kaloper

Foreign members
Bogdan Maglić
Sergei Novikov
Vilen Andreyevich Zharikov
Tihomir Novakov
Vasiliy Sergeyevich Vladimirov
Yuriy Tsolakovich Oganesian
Pantó György
Blagovest Sendov
William N. Everitt
Dietrich H. Welte
Julius Erich Wess
André Berger
Dionigi Galletto
Igor Shafarevich
Anton Zeilinger
Endre Süli
Milan Herak - resigned
Vladimir Majer - resigned

Department of Chemical and Biological Sciences
Dušan Kanazir
Milutin Stefanović
Vojislav Petrović - Representative of the Department
Dragomir Vitorović
Paula Putanov - Representative in Novi Sad
Dušan Čamprag
Slobodan Ribnikar
Miroslav Gašić - Secretary of the Department of Chemical and Biological Sciences
Iván Gutman
Dragoslav Marinković
Živorad Čeković

Corresponding members
Radoslav Adžić
Živorad Čeković
Dragan Škorić
Marko Anđelković
Miljenko Perić
Nikola Tucić
Vladimir Stevanović
Bogdan Šolaja

Nonresident members
Radomir Crkvenjakov
Slobodan Macura
Stanko Stojilković
Nenad Kostić
Dražen Zimonjić

Foreign members
Seymour Cohen
Paul M. Doty
Dušan Hadžić
Miha Tišler
Drago Grdenić
Chintamani Nagesa Ramachandra Rao
Richard M. Spriggs
John O'Mara Bockris
Guy Ourisson
Michael Simic
Branislav Vidić
Emil Špaldon
Constantin E. Sekeris
Igor Vladimirovich Torgov
Velibor Krsmanović
Frank E. Karas
Francisco J. Ayala
Stanley Prusiner
Borislav Bogdanović
Paul Greengard

Department of Technical Sciences
Ilija Obradović
Nikola Hajdin - President
Petar Miljanić - Secretary of the Department of Technical Sciences
Jovan Surutka
Momčilo Ristić
Dragutin Dražić - Representative of the Department
Dušan Milović
Đorđe Zloković
Miomir Vukobratović
Vladan Đorđević
Aleksandar Marinčić
Ilija Stojanović
Pantelija Nikolić
Đorđe Đukić
Boško Petrović
Antonije Đorđević

Corresponding members
Boško Petrović
Dragutin Zelenović
Antonije Đorđević

Zoran Lj. Petrović
Teodor Atanacković
Ninoslav Stojadinović
Zoran Đurić
Zoran Popović

Foreign members
Dragoslav D. Šiljak
Bruno Thürlimann
Konstantin Vasilyevich Frolov
Vukan R. Vuchic
Valeriy Vladimirovich Skorohod
Anthony N. Kounadis
Valentin Vitalyevich Rumyancev
Felix Leonidovich Chernoushko
Dmitriy Yevgeniyevich Ohotsimski
Miloš Ercegovac
Zoran D. Popović
Zoja Popović
Ingo Müller
Miroslav Krstić

Department of Medical Sciences
Ljubisav Rakić - Representative of the Department
Zlatibor Petrović - Secretary of the Department of Medical Sciences
Vladimir Kanjuh
Vojin Šulović
Miroslav Radovanović
Zoran Kovačević - President of SASA Branch in Novi Sad
Živojin Bumbaširević
Sveto Suša
Veselinka Šušić
Vladimir Bošnjaković
Miodrag Ostojić
Vladimir S. Kostić
Miroslav Simić
Bogdan Đuričić
Vladimir S. Kostić
Vladimir Bumbaširević
Ninoslav Radovanović
Dragan Micić
Miodrag Čolić
Sava Perović
Radoje Čolović
Jovan Hadži-Đokić

Corresponding members

Vladislav Stefanović
Predrag Peško
Vojislav Leković
Nebojša Lalić
Đorđe Radak
Nebojša Radunović
Dušica Lečić

Nonresident members
Jovan Rašković
Dragutin Vukotić
Stojanka Aleksić
Dragan Švrakić
Milan Stevanović

Foreign members
Georges Mathé
Jean Bernard
Paško Rakić
Jesse E. Edwards
Denton Cooley
Lapis Károly
Alexander Margulis
Tamio Yamakawa
Gennady Alekseyevich Buznikov
Kassai Tibor
Momir Polenaković
Yevgeny Ivanovich Chazov
Vasilios D. Thanopoulos
Harden M. McConnell
Berislav Zloković
Eugenio Picano
Hiroshi Akiyama
Ronald Grossarth Maticek
Felix Unger - president of the European Academy of Sciences and Arts
Roger Gilman
Pavlos Tutuzas
Gaetano Thiene
Henry N. Wagner
Veljko Vlaisavljević
Antonio Colombo
Torsten Wiesel
Miodrag Radulovački

Department of Language and Literature
Vojislav Đurić
Dobrica Ćosić
Erih Koš
Miroslav Pantić
Stevan Raičković
Milka Ivić
Irena Grickat-Radulović
Miodrag Pavlović
Dragoslav Mihailović
Predrag Palavestra - Secretary of the Department of Language and Literature
Matija Bećković
Milorad Pavić
Szeli István
Svetozar Petrović
Pavle Ugrinov
Zoran Konstantinović
Ljubomir Simović
Nikola Milošević
Nikša Stipčević - Representative of the Department
Svetozar Koljević
Vladeta Jerotić
Aleksandar Mladenović
Ivan Klajn
Milosav Tešić

Corresponding members
Dušan Kovačević
Milosav Tešić
Nada Milošević-Đorđević
Aleksandar Loma
Predrag Piper
Milorad Radovanović
Svetlana Velmar-Janković

Nonresident members
Milovan Danojlić
David Albahari

Foreign members
Stanislaus Hafner
Antonio Emilio Tachiaos
Peer Jacobsen
Reinhard Lauer
Vladimir Nikolayevich Voynovich
Rolf Dieter Kluge
Jean Dutourd
Zuzanna Topolińska
Svetlana Mihailovna Tolstoy
Iliya Konev
Ronald Harwood
Konrád György
Aksinia Dzhurova
Gabriella Schubert
Vlada Urošević
Manfred Jänichen
Gerhard Neweklowsky

Department of Social Sciences
Mihailo Marković - Representative of the Department
Dimitrije Stefanović - General Secretary
Ivan Maksimović
Kosta Mihailović
Aleksandar Fira
Ljubomir Tadić
Mihailo Đurić - Secretary of the Department of Social Sciences
Várady Tibor
Vojislav Stanovčić

Corresponding members
Časlav Ocić
Danilo Basta
Kosta Čavoški
Aleksandar Kostić

Foreign members
Djahangir Aly Abbas Kerimov
Maurice Duverger
Jürgen Habermas
Alex N. Dragnich
Pierre Marie Gallois
Stanley Rosen
Noam Chomsky
Masayuki Iwata
Vladimir Stipetić - resigned

Department of Historical Sciences
Dejan Medaković
Sima Ćirković
Slavko Gavrilović
Vladimir Stojančević
Vasilije Krestić - Secretary of the Department of Historical Sciences
Vojislav Korać
Čedomir Popov
Milorad Ekmečić - Representative of the Department
Desanka Kovačević-Kojić
Nikola Tasić - Secretary-General
Slobodan Dušanić
Gojko Subotić
Miloš Blagojević
Dinko Davidov

Corresponding members
Andrej Mitrović
Jovanka Kalić
Dinko Davidov
Miloš Blagojević
Momčilo Spremić
Ljubomir Maksimović
Borislav Jovanović
Dragoljub Živojinović
Mirjana Živojinović
Ljubodrag Dimić

Nonresident members
Dimitrije Djordjević
Vlado Strugar
Slobodan Ćurčić
Zagorka Gavrilović
Jelena Milojković-Đurić

Foreign members
 David MacKenzie
 Aleksandar Popović
Halil İnalcık
 Charalambos Bouras
Aleksandar Fol
Noël Duval
Harald Hauptmann
Friedbert Ficker
Cvetan Grozdanov
Elena Guskova
Karlheinz Deschner
Panagiotis Vokotopoulos
Angeliki Laiou
Tjalling Waterbolk - resigned

Department of Fine Arts and Music
Ljubica Sokić
Dušan Radić
Olga Jevrić
Mladen Srbinović - Vice-President
Svetomir Arsić - Basara
Dejan Despić - Secretary of the Department of Fine Arts and Music
Radomir Reljić - Representative of the Department
Nikola Janković

Corresponding members
Bogdan Bogdanović
Nikola Janković
Vlastimir Trajković
Dušan Otašević
Milan Lojanica
Todor Stevanović
Ivan Jevtić
Isidora Žebeljan
Branislav Mitrović

Nonresident members
Vladimir Veličković
Milorad Bata Mihailović
Dušan Džamonja
Ljubomir-Ljuba Popović
Petar Omčikus

Foreign members
Boris Podrecca
Petrovics Emil
Tome Serafimovski

Sanu